Holly is an unincorporated community in Houston County, Texas. Holly had a post office from 1886 to 1914. Its population was estimated to be 112 as of 2000.

References

Unincorporated communities in Houston County, Texas
Unincorporated communities in Texas